"Antilife" means antagonistic or antithetical to normal human values, as with:

Dehumanization
Misanthropy
Nuclear weapons
Sexual repression

Anti-life may also refer to:

Fiction
The Anti-Life Equation, in Jack Kirby's Fourth World comics
The Anti-Life, a character in "The Alternative Factor", an episode of Star Trek
Anti-life, a stone in the 2003 fantasy novel Death Masks
 Anti-Life, alternate title for the 2020 science-fiction film Breach

Music
"The Anti-Life", a song by Howards Alias from their album The Chameleon Script
"The Anti-Life", a song by Skylar from their album Skylar
Disiplin Anti-Life, a CD published by Moonfog Productions

Politics
As a pejorative term:
Favoring the abortion-rights movement or the availability of contraception
Favoring the death penalty